Alberta Provincial Highway No. 627, commonly referred to as Highway 627, is a highway in the province of Alberta, Canada. It takes name Maskêkosihk Trail passes 215 Street/Winterburn Road,  before terminating at 184th Street, and continuing along 184th Street to the Anthony Henday Drive in Edmonton. 
Portions of 23 Avenue NW and 184 Street NW between Winterburn Road and Anthony Henday Drive were renamed Maskêkosihk Trail in February 2016 to honour Cree heritage.

Major intersections 
Starting from the west end of Highway 627:

See also 

 Transportation in Edmonton

References

External links 
Maskêkosihk Trail – City of Edmonton Naming Committee

627
Roads in Edmonton